Polypoetes leuschneri is a moth of the family Notodontidae first described by James S. Miller in 2008. It is endemic to the Pacific slope of the Ecuadorian Andes.

The length of the forewings is 13–14.5 mm for males and 13.5–15 mm for females. The ground color of the forewings is dark chocolate brown. The ground color of the hindwings is blackish brown, slightly darker than the forewings.

Etymology
The species is named in honor of Ron Leuschner, a former president of the Lepidopterists' Society, and a research associate of the Natural History Museum of Los Angeles County.

References

Moths described in 2008
Notodontidae of South America